Aaron Terence Downes (born 15 May 1985) is a former Australian soccer player who played as a defender. He is currently assistant manager at Torquay United.

Club career
Born in Mackay, Queensland and raised in Mudgee, New South Wales, Downes was signed for Chesterfield on 1 August 2004 by ex Chesterfield manager Roy MacFarland after having trials at Bolton Wanderers and a short spell at non league outfit Frickley Athletic. Before moving to England he was a player at the Australian Institute of Sport.

At the end of the 2006–07 season following his side's relegation to Football League Two not only did he sign an extension to his current contract at Chesterfield but he also was made team captain of Chesterfield following the departure of ex captain Mark Allott. Downes was at that time a valued member of the squad and as well as his defensive qualities he has an eye for goal, mainly from set pieces.

On 22 April 2009, Downes signed a new 2-year contract extension with Chesterfield, despite the defender picking up a serious knee injury before the contract was signed. He was released by the club at the end of the 2011–12 season having suffered further serious injuries during his tenure.

In July 2012 Downes signed a one-year contract with Torquay United. Manager, Martin Ling said of Downes, "He needs someone to take a punt and that is the right word for a player who has suffered two cruciates". He enjoyed a successful season, striking up a strong defensive partnership with Brian Saah, culminating in him being voted the supporters' "Player of the season". In June 2013, he signed a new two-year contract to keep him at Torquay United until 2015.

On 11 May 2015, Gary Johnson made Downes his first signing at Cheltenham Town. Although sidelined by a knee injury for a large part of 2016, he captained the side to the National League title and continued to lead them in their first season back in the English Football League.

Downes retired from football at the end of the 2017–18 season.

On 13 December 2018, Downes was appointed assistant manager at former club Torquay United.

International career
Over the years he has worked his way up at international level starting at the 2005 FIFA World Youth Championship in the Netherlands. He was also called up by the Olyroos – the Australia national under-23 football team.

Honours

Club
Chesterfield
Football League Two: 2010–11

Cheltenham Town
 National League: 2015–16

International
Australia national football team
OFC U-20 Championship: 2005

Individual
Chesterfield Player of the Year: 2006–07
 Torquay United Player of the Year: 2012–13

References

External links

1985 births
Living people
People from Mudgee
Australian soccer players
Australian expatriate soccer players
Australian expatriate sportspeople in England
Association football defenders
Hampton & Richmond Borough F.C. players
Frickley Athletic F.C. players
Chesterfield F.C. players
Bristol Rovers F.C. players
Torquay United F.C. players
Cheltenham Town F.C. players
Torquay United F.C. non-playing staff
English Football League players
Isthmian League players
Northern Premier League players
Sportsmen from New South Wales
Soccer players from New South Wales